Zara Abid (4 April 199222 May 2020) was a Pakistani model and actress. She was featured in various photo shoots. She made her film debut in Chaudhry, directed by Azeem Sajjad.

She was one of the passengers who died aboard PIA Flight 8303, which crashed in Karachi, Pakistan, on 22 May 2020.

Personal life
Zara Abid was born on 4 April in Lahore, Punjab. She grew up and resided in Karachi with her family and completed her schooling at St. Patrick's Girls High School, before graduating with a bachelor's degree and going into show business.

Modeling career
As a fashion icon, she was known for her tall height and tanned complexion, which made her stand out in an industry dominated by lighter-skin models. According to Abid, when she started modeling, she faced discrimination in being hired, allegedly due to her looks and skin colour. However, she stated she worked her way up and received opportunities on the basis of her professional skills and talent. She was described as "stunning and utterly unapologetic" about her color. According to a makeup artist who worked with her, Abid embodied the "dusky skin colour" of the majority of Pakistani women, and one of her makeup campaigns became a bestseller because it captured that. 

One of her photoshoots by a salon for the magazine Hello Mag in 2019, in which she was styled with a skin tone many shades darker than her own, evoked controversy for allegedly promoting "blackface" and cultural misappropriation, and was perceived by critics as racist. Abid had shared the pictures on her personal Instagram account. The posts were noted to have received backlash and trolling. Abid defended her photoshoot, stating the point was to empower darker-skinned women and send a message on their lack of representation; she also called out the "colourism" that allegedly existed in society, questioning why she was being criticized for adopting a dark profile when in numerous other photoshoots, she had been purposefully presented in lighter tones.

The designer brands for which she had modeled include Sana Safinaz, Wajahat Mansoor, Annus Abrar, Zaheer Abbas, Deepak and Fahad, Payal Keyal, Alkaram, Gul Ahmed, Kayseria, Dhanak, Rang Ja, Generation, Republic Women's Wear, and Hussain Rehar. She appeared in television commercials, such as for Zong 4G.

Film and television
Abid began her acting career with her debut role in the upcoming film Chaudhry, directed by Azeem Sajjad and written by Zeeshan Junaid. The film is a biopic about slain police officer Chaudhry Aslam Khan, in which Abid plays a college student. Talking about her role in an interview, Abid said it was very much relatable to her real-life persona, adding that "the character is really strong and I didn’t think twice before saying yes. The script was narrated to me over the phone and I immediately agreed." She began shooting for the film in December 2018. The film is expected to be released in 2020.

On 16 January 2019, she appeared as a guest on the late night television comedy show Mazaaq Raat. On 24 May 2020, her first and only short film Sikka was uploaded to YouTube two days after her death as a tribute. Abid portrays two female characters whose lives are polar opposites in terms of wealth and social status; yet, despite never crossing paths and living very differently, they share similar trials and struggles as women in society. The film does not have dialogue and is narrated in third person by Saba Qamar.

Death
On 22 May 2020, Abid was amongst the passengers of the PIA Flight 8303, which crashed while on final approach for landing near the Jinnah International Airport in Karachi; she was said to be returning to the city after attending her uncle's funeral in Lahore. A flight manifest released by PIA showed her name on the list of passengers. 97 deaths were reported from the 99 people on board, and she was not reported as one of the survivors. She had been modeling for clothing brand Sana Safinaz at the time when she had to reportedly leave for Lahore. Some initial reports claimed she had survived the accident. After the crash, Abid's brother told the media that her family were still looking for her at the hospital where the injured were admitted, and that they were waiting for an update from authorities. Her brother appealed to stop the spread of fake news regarding the matter.

Tributes started to appear on social media as soon as news of the plane accident broke. Many celebrities from the fashion and entertainment industries expressed their condolences when her death was confirmed. Abid was also the target of online abuse from many people for what she used to wear and her lifestyle choices, leading to her accounts on social media platforms being deactivated.

Awards and nominations
In January 2020, Abid won an award in the category of "Best Female Model" at the 4th Hum Style Awards. She was also named in the "Top 100 People" list by Hello! magazine's Pakistan edition.

References

1992 births
2020 deaths
21st-century Pakistani actresses
Actresses from Karachi
Actresses from Lahore
Pakistani female models
Victims of aviation accidents or incidents in Pakistan
Victims of aviation accidents or incidents in 2020